The 1990 World Karate Championships are the 10th edition of the World Karate Championships, and were held in Mexico City, Mexico from November 8 to November 11, 1990.

Medalists

Men

Women

Medal table

References

 Results
 Results

External links
 Karateka magazine report
 World Karate Federation

World Championships
World Karate Championships
World Karate Championships
Karate Championships
Karate competitions in Mexico
1990s in Mexico City
Sports competitions in Mexico City
November 1990 sports events in Mexico